Aston Martin has made a number of mechanically similar V8 engines over the years, since the first one used in the Aston Martin V8 in 1969. They have been both naturally-aspirated and supercharged.

Background
The 1969–1972 Aston Martin DBS V8 coupe/convertible was Aston Martin's first V8 model. This engine was an all-aluminium construction with double overhead camshafts and was used in several models up until 2000 when the Virage model was discontinued.

Production of V8-engined Aston Martin cars resumed in 2005 with a new generation of the Vantage, powered by the Jaguar AJ-V8 naturally aspirated V8 engine. Since 2016, Aston Martin has switched to the Mercedes-Benz M177 turbocharged V8 engine, beginning with the DB11 model.

Applications

Road cars
Aston Martin DBS
Aston Martin V8
Aston Martin Lagonda
Aston Martin Bulldog (concept car)
Aston Martin V8 Zagato
Aston Martin Virage
Aston Martin V8 Vantage

Race cars
Aston Martin RHAM/1
Nimrod NRA/C2 (Tickford)
EMKA Aston Martin (Tickford)
Aston Martin AMR1 (Callaway)

References

V8 engines
Aston Martin